"I Want Out" is a song by the German power metal band Helloween from the album Keeper of the Seven Keys, Pt. 2, that was released as a single in 1988.

It was written by Kai Hansen, who said in an interview that it was a hint of him really wanting "out" of the band. Musically, the song is characterised by a recognisable introduction and Michael Kiske's trademark high pitched singing in the chorus. It is also punk-influenced (especially the rebellious lyrics) in contrast to other Helloween songs, or Hansen's post-Helloween work.

The promovideo was shown on MTV and was directed by Storm Thorgerson. 

It is one of the Helloween's most recognizable songs, and is often performed live by Helloween and both Hansen's and Kiske's current bands Gamma Ray and Unisonic. The song was covered by HammerFall, Sonata Arctica, Avalanch and Skylark.

Track listing
All songs written by Kai Hansen, except where noted.

Credits
Michael Kiske - lead vocals
Kai Hansen - lead and rhythm guitars, backing vocals
Michael Weikath - lead and rhythm guitars, backing vocals
Markus Grosskopf - bass guitar
Ingo Schwichtenberg - drums

Charts

Cover versions

HammerFall

"I Want Out" was released as a cover-single by the Swedish metal band HammerFall on 31 August 1999. It is the second single released from their album Legacy of Kings.

It is notable for Kai Hansen's appearance on guitar, lead vocals (along with Hammerfall's vocalist Joacim Cans) and keyboards.

Track listing

Personnel
Joacim Cans - lead and backing vocals
Oscar Dronjak - guitar and backing vocals
Stefan Elmgren - lead guitar
Magnus Rosén - bass guitar
Patrik Räfling - drums

Additional personnel
Track 1: Vocals, guitar and keyboards by Kai Hansen, backing vocals by Udo Dirkschneider.
Track 2: Lead guitar by William J. Tsamis.
Track 3: Drums by AC, backing vocals by Kai Hansen.

Chart Positions

Charts

Release information
Limited edition red 7" vinyl single with "I Want Out" on side A and "At the End of the Rainbow" on side B.

Others
In 2000, Sonata Arctica released a cover version of this song on two of their EPs, Successor and Takatalvi. It was also released on the Helloween tribute album The Keepers of Jericho - Part I.
Skylark also covered the song, in the same tribute album, with female vocals.
Eddy Antonini from the Italian power metal band Skylark also performs a cover of this song along with several guest musicians on his solo album When Water Became Ice.
Gamma Ray, Kai Hansen's current band, also performs the song.
In 2006, the Australian band Lord performed this song live at the Metro Theater in Sydney.
The Spanish power metal band Avalanch performed a live cover on their Días De Gloria album.
The Australian power metal band Winterstorm performed this song on their "teaser" demo ...begun and continue to play it at various live shows.
The Swedish progressive metal band Seventh Wonder performed the song in 2010, during their final concert with Johnny Sandin as drummer. As a surprise to him, they asked him to leave the drum set in the middle of the song and perform vocals in the final section.
The band Driving Mrs. Satan released a folk singer-style cover of the song in 2013.
In 2012, Kiske's and Hansen's band, Unisonic, included a live performance of the song at the Loud Park Festival on their Ignition EP.
The Russian power metal band Epidemia at least once performed the song at a concert
The Swedish power metal band ShadowQuest covered this song on their second album Gallows of Eden, released in 2020.

References

1988 singles
Helloween songs
Songs written by Kai Hansen
1988 songs